Neer dosa, literally meaning water dosa in Tulu is a crêpe prepared from rice batter. Neer dosa is a delicacy from Tulu Nadu, Karnataka State and part of Mangalorean cuisine.

Overview
Neer is the word for water in Tulu and Kannada.

Unlike other dosas neer dosa is known for its simple preparation method and lack of fermentation. Usually neer dosa is served with coconut chutney, sambar, saagu and non vegetarian curries like chicken, mutton, fish and egg curry.

Ingredients 
Even though many variations exist for Neer Dosa batter, the two basic ingredients common to all of them are just soaked rice (or rice flour) and salt.

Preparation 
There is no requirement for fermentation of the rice in order to prepare Neer dosa. The rice needs to be soaked for at least 2 hours. After a quick wash and a drain the rice needs to be ground by adding water in order to get very fine batter. Additional amount of water can be added based on the thickness of the batter and then salt is added for taste. Finally the batter is used to prepare the dosa.

See also
 List of Indian breads

References

External links
 

Indian breads
Karnataka cuisine
Culture of Karnataka
Mangalorean cuisine
Tulu Nadu
Dosa
Rice breads